Coronado High School (CHS) is a public high school in Colorado Springs, Colorado, United States. It is part of the Colorado Springs School District 11.

Coronado High School is located on Mesa Road and Fillmore Street, on a mesa overlooking Colorado Springs, with a view of Pikes Peak and Garden of the Gods.

The school's colors are scarlet red and new gold, and its mascot is the cougar.

Athletics 
Coronado has 19 sports programs, including 7 during the fall, 5 during the winter, and 7 during the spring. The school currently competes at the 5-A athletics level.

Fall 

 Football
 Girls Volleyball
 Cross Country
 Boys Soccer
 Softball
 Boys Tennis
 Boys Golf

Winter 

 Boys Basketball
 Girls Basketball
 Wrestling
 Ice Hockey
 Girls Swimming

Spring 

 Baseball
 Boys Swimming
 Boys Volleyball
 Girls Golf
 Girls Tennis
 Track
 Girls Soccer

Extracurricular Organizations

Robotics 
In 2008, Coronado's FIRST Robotics Competition Team 2996 "Cougars Gone Wired" was founded. Team 2996 has won a regional event on 3 separate occasions.

KUGR-TV 
Coronado students enrolled in the KUGR-TV class produce a weekly television show for the student body, which is viewable on the school's YouTube channel.

Theater 
Thespian Troupe 3397 has performed through the school's theater department since 2014.

Notable alumni

Henry Cejudo, Olympic gold medalist
Steven T. Seagle, writer and producer of comic books, film and television

References

External links 

Colorado Springs School District 11 webpage

High schools in Colorado Springs, Colorado
Public high schools in Colorado